Pajonga Daeng Ngalle Karaeng Polongbangkeng (1901 – February 23, 1958) was an Indonesian governor who helped coordinate attacks in South Sulawesi during the National Revolution as well as promote integration in Indonesia. He was conferred the titles of "National Hero of Indonesia" ("Pahlawan Nasional") and "Tanda Kehormatan Bintang Maha Putra Adipradana" in 2006.

References 

1901 births
1958 deaths
People from Sulawesi
National Heroes of Indonesia